Ouvrage La Béole is a lesser work (petit ouvrage) of the Maginot Line's Alpine extension, the Alpine Line. The ouvrage consists of two entry blocks and one observation block facing Italy. The ouvrage was manned by 94 soldiers in 1940, under the command of Sub-Lieutenant Caillard. Additional blocks were planned but not built. The ouvrage was never provided with electricity. Three more blocks were planned but not built.

Description 
Block 1 (entry): one light machine gun embrasure and one twin heavy machine gun embrasure.
Block 2 (entry): one light machine gun embrasure.
Block 3 (infantry): one observation/machine gun cloche.

See also 
 List of Alpine Line ouvrages

References

Bibliography 
Allcorn, William. The Maginot Line 1928-45. Oxford: Osprey Publishing, 2003. 
Kaufmann, J.E. and Kaufmann, H.W. Fortress France: The Maginot Line and French Defenses in World War II, Stackpole Books, 2006. 
Kaufmann, J.E., Kaufmann, H.W., Jancovič-Potočnik, A. and Lang, P. The Maginot Line: History and Guide, Pen and Sword, 2011. 
Mary, Jean-Yves; Hohnadel, Alain; Sicard, Jacques. Hommes et Ouvrages de la Ligne Maginot, Tome 1. Paris, Histoire & Collections, 2001.  
Mary, Jean-Yves; Hohnadel, Alain; Sicard, Jacques. Hommes et Ouvrages de la Ligne Maginot, Tome 4 - La fortification alpine. Paris, Histoire & Collections, 2009.  
Mary, Jean-Yves; Hohnadel, Alain; Sicard, Jacques. Hommes et Ouvrages de la Ligne Maginot, Tome 5. Paris, Histoire & Collections, 2009.

External links 
 La Béole (petit ouvrage) at fortiff.be 
 

LABE
Maginot Line
Alpine Line